Valmikipuram (also known as Vayalpadu and Vayalpad) is a Town in Annamayya district of the Indian state of Andhra Pradesh. It is the mandal headquarters. The town is known for the "Sri Pattabhi Rama temple", built by lord Jambavantha in Treta Yuga. Valmiki, the author of great epic Ramayana 'taposthan'(did tapas here).
Kodanda Ramaylam was built by Lord Jambavantha in Treta Yuga as a mark of his respect towards Lord Sri Rama. Uniqueness of this temple is that here Lord Sri Rama will be seen in the coronation ceremony posture as presiding deity flanked by His beloved Goddess Sita Devi and also by his brothers  Laxmana, Bharatha, Shatrughna, and Lord Anjaneya. Here SriRama also called as ‘Pratapa Raama’ as he is holding sword. There is also a hill here called 'Veeranna Konda' with the shrine of Veerabhadra. It is said that the sage Valmiki sat on this hill while writing The Ramayana. Another uniqueness of this Temple Idol in this Temple is facing North and Locals says that it is the only Temple in Andhra Pradesh with North facing. Tallapaka Ananmacharya penned as many as 21 ‘sankeertanas’ in praise of the Pattabhirama Swamy deity here. Kodanda Rama Swamy Temple is holding 500 years of history, this temple well managed in Krishna Deva Raya’s period and Chola’s period. In 1997, TTD (Tirumala tirupati Devasthanams) adopted and from then temple has seen drastic growth.

Geography

It has an average elevation of 611 meters (2007 feet). Amaravati is the state capital for Valmikipuram Town. It is located around 418.7 kilometers away from Valmikipuram. The other nearest state capital from Valmikipuram is Bangalore and its distance is 136.4 km. The other surrounding state capitals are Bangalore 136.4 km., Chennai 189.6 KM., Pondicherry 229.2 km Valmikipuram Sun rise time
Valmikipuram Town is located in the UTC 5.30 time zone and it follows Indian standard time (IST). Valmikipuram sun rise time varies 13 minutes from IST. The vehicle driving side in Valmikipuram is left, all vehicles should take left side during driving. Valmikipuram people are using its national currency which is Indian Rupee and its international currency code is INR. Valmikipuram phones and mobiles can be accessed by adding the India country dialing code +91 from abroad.

Source : Climate

References

Villages in Annamayya district
Mandal headquarters in Annamayya district